Franciszek Salezy Krupiński (January 22, 1836, Łukowie near Siedlce – August 16, 1898, Warsaw) was a Polish philosopher.

Life
Krupiński was an early representative of Polish Positivism.  He preached "organic work" and (though himself a Catholic priest) fought against Catholic and Romantic philosophy.

Works
Filozofia w Polsce (Philosophy in Poland; 1863)
Szkoła pozytywna (The Positive School; 1868)
Romantyzm i jego skutki (Romanticism and Its Consequences; 1876)
Nasza historiozofia (Our Philosophy of History; 1876).

See also
History of philosophy in Poland
List of Poles

Notes

References
"Krupiński, Franciszek," Encyklopedia Powszechna PWN (PWN Universal Encyclopedia), Warsaw, Państwowe Wydawnictwo Naukowe, vol. 2, 1974, p. 612.

1836 births
1898 deaths
19th-century Polish philosophers